The British Ice Hockey Superleague (BISL, also known as the Sekonda Ice Hockey Superleague from 1998 to 1999 for sponsorship reasons) was a professional ice hockey league in the United Kingdom between 1996 and 2003. Devised in 1995, it replaced the premier division of the British Hockey League at the end of 1995–1996 season; following the major reshuffle of the league and the split between the first and second tier divisions; with the British National League becoming the new second tier division. It was disbanded after the 2002-03 season and replaced by the Elite Ice Hockey League. Unlike its North American counterparts, the Superleague was not divided into conferences; teams competed in a single division.

History
The Ice Hockey Superleague Ltd was established on 1 November 1995 and held its first season in 1996-97 with eight founding clubs – Ayr Scottish Eagles, Basingstoke Bison, Bracknell Bees, Cardiff Devils, Manchester Storm, Newcastle Cobras, Nottingham Panthers, and Sheffield Steelers.

Overview
Several competitions fell under the jurisdiction of the Superleague. The Superleague ran a total of four competitions: the League, the Play-offs, the Express Cup and the Benson and Hedges Cup. The league consisted of a single division, each team playing three home games and three away games against the other teams in the league. Two points were awarded for a win and one point for an overtime defeat. Overtime consisted of 10 minutes of sudden death. The team that had most points after all fixtures were completed were declared Superleague champions.

After the regular season was complete, the teams would be entered into the play-offs, the winner of which won the British Championship. The teams were entered into two groups, Group A and Group B, each team playing three home games and three away games against the other teams in the group. Two points were awarded for a win and one point for an overtime defeat. Overtime consisted of 10 minutes of sudden death. The top two teams in each group qualified for the semi-finals, which were straight knockout matches. Both the semi finals and final took place over the course of a weekend.

The Superleague was governed by a board of directors who were the owners of the participating teams with Martin Weddell as chairman. The chief executive Ian Taylor from 1996 to 1902 was replaced by the league's former secretary, Brian Storey in what would be the league's final season of 2003. A system of promotion and relegation was not operated by the Superleague; teams entered the league on the basis of a decision by the Board of Directors, however the British National league was regarded as the league below the level of the Superleague.

Trophy
The trophy that was awarded to the winners of the superleague, was called the Ice hockey superleague trophy. It was a silver replica of a George III Monteith Bowl. In the inaugural season, the trophy was taken around the arenas of the superleague teams and publicly displayed on the following dates:

 21 September 1996 – Bracknell
 22 September 1996 – Cardiff
 1 October 1996 – Nottingham
 5 October 1996 – Sheffield
 10 October 1996 – Newcastle
 10 November 1996 – Ayr
 17 November 1996 – Manchester
 23 November 1996 – Basingstoke

The trophy itself resembled a Monteith bowl used to cool wine (or punch) glasses that are suspended by their feet through the scallop-edged rim of the bowl. The bowl itself was made of silver, was 14 inches in diameter and 12 inches tall with a mahogany plinth.

Sekonda sponsorship
In 1998, the Superleague secured a major sponsorship deal with Sekonda. Sekonda remained the title sponsor until 2002, during which time the league was known as the Sekonda Ice Hockey Superleague. During this time, the man of the match awards were presented with a Sekonda watch.

Each month one of the man of the match winners would be selected as the Sekonda Face to Watch. At the end of each season the Sekonda Superleague Player of the Year would be selected from the Sekonda Face to Watch winners by a panel of journalists — except for the season 2001-02 when Sekonda's sponsorship finished part way through the season.

(names in bold won the Sekonda Superleague Player of the Year award)

Collapse
Cardiff Devils and Newcastle Jesters pulled out of the league in 2001, reducing the membership of the Superleague to seven clubs. Then, Manchester Storm and Scottish Eagles both folded within a week of one another during the early stages of the 2002-03 season, leaving just five teams remaining. To make matters worse, in December 2002 Bracknell Bees announced their intention to resign from the league to join the BNL at the end of the season, and uncertainty arose surrounding the future of London Knights and their London Arena home at this time; which ultimately led to the Knights folding in 2003. Owing a large debt to Ice Hockey UK and facing the prospect of having only three member clubs, the Superleague placed itself into liquidation on 30 April 2003.

Elite ice hockey league
The Elite Ice Hockey League was formed by the remaining three clubs (Belfast Giants, Nottingham Panthers, and Sheffield Steelers) and played their first season on 12 September 2003. The Elite league is seen as the successor league to the Ice Hockey Superleague.

Participating clubs
The superleague was formed with eight founding clubs, with nine participating at any one time at its peak. Ten clubs have played in the Superleague.

* Denotes founding member
† Club folded in the 2002–03 season.

Champions

Criticism
There were two main areas of criticism of the Superleague. It was widely regarded that the league was too reliant on imported players, illustrated by the participation of only four British trained players in the 2003 season. The financial situation of the league was unsustainable partly due to a high salary cap at £400k. Smaller teams such as Bracknell couldn't compete with the larger arena teams who had higher revenues.

Notes

See also
British ice hockey league champions

 
1
Sports leagues established in 1996
1996 establishments in the United Kingdom
2003 disestablishments in the United Kingdom
Defunct multi-national ice hockey leagues in Europe